Michael Stern may refer to:

 Michael Stern (conductor) (born 1959), American musician
 Michael Stern (educator) (1922–2002), founder of the Waterford Kamhlaba United World College
 Michael Stern (journalist) (1910–2009), American journalist and philanthropist
 Michael Stern (British politician) (born 1942), British Conservative Party politician
 Michael Stern (real estate developer) (born 1979), American real estate developer
 Michael Stern (born 1947), American writer in the team Jane and Michael Stern
 Michael Stern (Jamaican politician), Jamaica Labour Party politician
 Michael Stern (zoologist), American zookeeper, conservationist, anthropologist and primatologist
 Mike Stern (born 1953), American jazz guitarist

See also
 Mikhail Stern (1918–2005), Soviet dissident
 Michael Stearns (disambiguation)